This is part of a list of Statutes of New Zealand for the period of the Third National Government of New Zealand up to and including part of the first year of the Fourth Labour Government of New Zealand.

1970s

1976  

 Alcoholic Liquor Advisory Council Act  Amended: 1977/78/79/86/87/89
 Christchurch Town Hall Board of Management Act 
 District Grand Lodges of English Freemasons of New Zealand Trustees Act 
 Energy Resources Levy Act  Amended: 1978/83
 Foreign Travel Tax Act 
 Income Tax Act  Amended: 1977/78/79/80/81/82/83/84/85/86/87/88/89/90/91/92/93/94/98/99/2005
 International Energy Agreement Act 
 Optometrists and Dispensing Opticians Act  Amended: 1980/82/94/96/99
 Plumbers, Gasfitters, and Drainlayers Act  Amended: 1980/85/86/88/92/93/99
 Poultry Board Act  Amended: 1978/87
 Small Claims Tribunals Act  Amended: 1979/85
 Stewart Island Reserves Empowering Act 
 Superannuation Schemes Act  Amended: 1982/87/90/92/94/96/98/2001/04
 Wanganui Computer Centre Act  Amended: 1977/79/80/83/85/86/89
 Wine Makers Levy Act  Amended: 1987
Plus 143 Acts amended

1977  

 Bay of Plenty Catchment Commission and Regional Water Board Administrative Expenses Re Act 
 Bay of Plenty Harbour Board Empowering Act 
 Building Performance Guarantee Corporation Act 
 Chateau Companies Act 
 Citizenship Act  Amended: 1979/85/92/2000/01/02/05
 Commonwealth Countries Act 
 Contraception, Sterilisation, and Abortion Act 1977  Amended: 1978/90
 Contractual Mistakes Act  Amended: 1985/2002
 Fishing Vessel Ownership Savings Act  Amended: 1980/83/84/87
 Government Superannuation Fund Act  Amended: 1976/78/79/80/85/86/87/88/89/90/91/92/95/97/99/2001/03/05
 Hawke's Bay Catchment Board Empowering Act 
 Higher Salaries Commission Act  Amended: 1980/82/83/85/87/88/89/92
 Human Rights Commission Act  Amended: 1981/82/83/85/91/92/93
 Insurance Law Reform Act 
 Joint Council for Local Authorities Services Act  Amended: 1978/88
 Ministry of Energy Act  Amended: 1981/83/85/87/88/89
 Motueka Borough Reclamation Act 
 New Zealand Planning Act  Amended: 1987
 Potato Industry Act  Amended: 1981/87
 Public Finance Act  Amended: 1980/81/82/83/86/87/90/91/92/94/99/2000/04
 Queen Elizabeth the Second National Trust Act  Amended: 1983/87/88/91/96/2003
 Reserves Act 1977  Amended: 1978/79/80/81/83/85/88/92/93/94/96/2005
 Road User Charges Act  Amended: 1979/80/81/82/84/86/88/89/92/95/97/2002
 Rotorua County Council Empowering Act 
 Safety of Children's Night Clothes Act 
 Seal of New Zealand Act 
 Securities Transfer Act  Amended: 1987/2007
 Seddon Shield Districts Trotting Jackpot Empowering Act 
 Shop Trading Hours Act  Amended: 1978/79/80/82/89
 Southland Harbour Board Reclamation and Empowering Act 
 State Services Conditions of Employment Act  Amended: 1978/79/80/81/82/83/85/87
 Territorial Sea and Exclusive Economic Zone Act  Amended: 1980/85/96
 Town and Country Planning Act 1977
 Wild Animal Control Act 1977  Amended: 1978/79/82/85/94/97/99
Plus 135 Acts amended and 1 Act repealed.

1978  

 Auckland Electric Power Board Act  Amended: 1958/63/69/75/79/81
 Christchurch-Lyttelton Road Tunnel Authority Dissolution Act 
 Co-operative Forestry Companies Act 
 Customs Order Confirmation Act 
 Heavy Engineering Research Levy Act  Amended: 1986/87/96
 Hive Levy Act  Amended: 1982
 Industrial Training Levies Act  Amended: 1985/89
 Liquid Fuels Trust Act 
 Marine Mammals Protection Act 1978  Amended: 1979/94
 Massage Parlours Act 1978 
 Mount Egmont Vesting Act 
 Nelson City Forestry Empowering Act 
 New Zealand Council for Postgraduate Medical Education Act  Amended: 1988
 New Zealand Film Commission Act  Amended: 1980/85/88/94/99
 New Zealand National Airways Corporation Dissolution Act 
 New Zealand Register of Osteopaths Incorporated Act 
 Northland Harbour Board Empowering Act 
 Noxious Plants Act  Amended: 1981/82/88
 Securities Act  Amended: 1979/82/86/88/93/94/96/97/98/2000/01/02/04/06/07
Plus 116 Acts amended and 1 Act repealed.

1979  

 Auckland Municipal Abattoir Livestock Auctions Empowering Act 
 Carriage of Goods Act  Amended: 1980/86/89
 Contractual Remedies Act  Amended: 1985/2002
 Electrical Registration Act  Amended: 1982
 International Departure Tax Act 
 National Development Act 1979  Amended: 1981
 Pesticides Act  Amended: 1987/94
 Public Service Investment Society Management Act 
 Remuneration Act 
 Reserves and Other Land Disposal Act 
 Rotorua High Schools Board Empowering Act 
 Toxic Substances Act  Amended: 1983/86/88
 Vocational Awards Act  Amended: 1982
 Waimea County Council Empowering Act 
Plus 146 Acts amended and 2 Acts repealed.

1980s

1980  
 Domestic Air Travel Tax Act 
 Family Courts Act  Amended: 1991/2000/04/07
 Family Proceedings Act  Amended: 1981/82/83/85/86/88/89/91/94/95/97/98/2000/01
 Maternity Leave and Employment Protection Act 
 Otago Southland Flood Relief Committee Empowering Act 
 Timaru Harbour Board Reclamation and Empowering Act 
 Urban Transport Act  Amended: 1982/85/88
Plus 108 Acts amended and 1 Act repealed.

1981  
 Anglican Church Trusts Act  Amended: 1989
 Antarctic Marine Living Resources Act  Amended: 1999/2001/02
 Boxing and Wrestling Act 
 Credit Contracts Act  Amended: 1982/98/99
 Factories and Commercial Premises Act  Amended: 1983/89
 Flags, Emblems, and Names Protection Act  Amended: 1985/98/99/2003/05
 Food Act 1981  Amended: 1985/96/2002
 Holidays Act  Amended: 1983/90/91/2004
 Mangere Lawn Cemetery Trustees Empowering Act 
 Medicines Act  Amended: 1985/87/89/90/92/94/99/2003/05
 Methodist Church Withells Road Cemetery Empowering Act 
 Music Teachers Act 
 New Zealand Railways Corporation Act  Amended: 1983/85/87/88/89/2003
 Otago Harbour Board Vesting, Reclamation, and Empowering Act 
 Pehiaweri Maori Church and Marae Site Vesting Act 
 Petroleum Demand Restraint Act 
 Phosphate Commission of New Zealand Act  Amended: 1982/86
 Psychologists Act  Amended: 1994/99
 Summary Offences Act  Amended: 1982/86/87/89/97/98/99
 Tauranga Moana Maori Trust Board Act 
 Thames-Coromandel District Council Ambulance Levy Act 
 Wine Makers Act  Amended: 1982/83/85/2000/03
 Winton Holdings Licensing Act 
Plus 115 Acts amended

1982  
 Canterbury Agricultural and Pastoral Association Empowering Act 
 Cornwall Park Endowment and Recreation Land Act 
 Dog Control and Hydatids Act  Amended: 1983/85/88/92
 Domestic Protection Act  Amended: 1983/85/86/87/94
 Friendly Societies and Credit Unions Act  Amended: 1985/87/2004/06/07
 Gas Act  Amended: 1987/93/97/2000/01/03/04/06/07
 Invercargill City Council Vesting and Empowering Act 
 New Zealand Guardian Trust Company Act  Amended: 1989/2001/05
 Noise Control Act  Amended: 1987
 Official Information Act  Amended: 1983/87/89/92/93/2003
 Papa Adoption Discharge Act 
 Pork Industry Board Act  Amended: 1987/88/2001
 Quarries and Tunnels Act 
 Westpac Banking Corporation Act 
Plus 136 Acts amended

1983  
 Administrator's Powers Act 
 Apprenticeship Act  Amended: 1985/91
 Area Health Boards Act  Amended: 1985/86/88/89/90/91/92
 Auckland Harbour Bridge Authority Dissolution Act  Amended: 1988
 Dannevirke and District Soldiers' Institute Dissolution Act 
 Dilworth Trustees Empowering Act 
 Films Act  Amended: 1985/87/90
 Fisheries Act 1983  Amended: 1908/12/14/23/26/36/45/48/53/56/59/62/63/64/65/67/68/69/70/71/72/74/75/77/79/80/81/82/86/90/91/92/93/94/95/2000/01/02/04
 Foreign Affairs and Overseas Service Act  Amended: 1986
 Forestry Rights Registration Act  Amended: 1993/94/95/98
 Government Life Insurance Corporation Act 
 Hakataramea Public Hall Trustees Empowering Act 
 Health Service Personnel Act  Amended: 1985/87
 New Zealand Forestry Council Act 
 Trustee Banks Act 
Plus 139 Acts amended

1984  
 The Statutes of New Zealand Act 
 Whangarei Refinery Expansion Project Disputes Act 
Plus 6 Acts amended

See also 
The above list may not be current and will contain errors and omissions. For more accurate information try:
 Walter Monro Wilson, The Practical Statutes of New Zealand, Auckland: Wayte and Batger 1867
 The Knowledge Basket: Legislation NZ
 New Zealand Legislation Includes some Imperial and Provincial Acts. Only includes Acts currently in force, and as amended.
 Legislation Direct List of statutes from 2003 to order

Lists of statutes of New Zealand